Sixty Cents an Hour is a 1923 American silent comedy film directed by Joseph Henabery and written by Grant Carpenter and Frank Condon. Starring Walter Hiers, Jacqueline Logan, Ricardo Cortez, Charles Stanton Ogle, Lucille Ward, and Robert Dudley, it was released on May 13, 1923, by Paramount Pictures.

Cast 
Walter Hiers as Jimmy Kirk
Jacqueline Logan as Mamie Smith
Ricardo Cortez as William Davis
Charles Stanton Ogle as James Smith
Lucille Ward as Mrs. Smith
Robert Dudley as Storekeeper
Clarence Burton as Crook
Guy Oliver as Crook
Cullen Tate as Crook

References

External links

1923 films
1920s English-language films
Silent American comedy films
1923 comedy films
Paramount Pictures films
Films directed by Joseph Henabery
American black-and-white films
American silent feature films
1920s American films